Jamie Jilynn Chung (born April 10, 1983) is an American actress and former reality television personality. She began her career in 2004 as a cast member on the MTV reality series The Real World: San Diego and subsequently through her appearances on its spin-off show, Real World/Road Rules Challenge: The Inferno II. She is regarded by many as the Real World alumna with the most successful media career.

She later transitioned into acting and has since become known for films such as Dragonball Evolution, Grown Ups, Premium Rush, Sorority Row, The Hangover Part II, Sucker Punch, and Big Hero 6 (2014). Chung received critical acclaim for her lead performance in the independent drama film Eden. Chung played the lead role in the miniseries Samurai Girl, was a series regular in the two seasons (2017–19) of the superhero drama series The Gifted, played the recurring role of Mulan in the ABC fantasy television series Once Upon a Time, and has been a series regular, since 2017, as the voice of Go Go Tomago for the animated Big Hero 6: The Seriesthe role she voiced in the 2014 film. Beginning in August 2020, Chung appeared in the recurring role of Ji-Ah on the HBO series Lovecraft Country.

Early life
Jamie Jilynn Chung was born April 10, 1983 in San Francisco, California, where she grew up. She and her older sister are second-generation Korean-American, raised by "traditional" parents who moved to the United States in 1980, and ran a hamburger restaurant. After graduating from Lowell High School in 2001, Chung attended and graduated from the University of California, Riverside with a B.A. in economics in 2005. She was a member of Kappa Kappa Gamma sorority.

Career

Reality television
Chung was a cast member on The Real World: San Diego, the 14th season of MTV's long-running reality TV show The Real World, which first aired in 2004. At the time she was selected to be on TRW:SD, she was described by MTV as a hard-working student who worked two jobs to pay her tuition but also enjoyed partying. She was also described by her friends as not having the best taste in men.

After appearing on The Real World, Chung appeared on its spin-off game show, Real World/Road Rules Challenge, as a cast member in that show's 2005 season, The Inferno II, during which she was a member of the "Good Guys" team, which squared off against the "Bad Asses". By the end of the season, after several cast members had been eliminated during the competition, Chung remained, along with her fellow Good Guys teammates Darrell Taylor, Landon Lueck, and Mike Mizanin. Chung and her teammates defeated the remaining members of the Bad Asses in the final event, and won the competition.

Acting

After her stint on The Real World, Chung began her acting career with various minor roles in television and films, including as Cordy Han in ten episodes of Days of Our Lives, as a Hooters girl in the 2007 comedy I Now Pronounce You Chuck and Larry, and in episodes of CSI: NY and Veronica Mars.

One of Chung's earliest on-camera appearances was in the music video for Rihanna's single "Umbrella", as first woman to the right of Jay Z. The video premiered April 26, 2007. In 2008 Chung had her first major onscreen role, as the series lead in the ABC Family television miniseries Samurai Girl.

She had supporting roles in the 2009 feature films Sorority Row and Dragonball Evolution, in the latter as Goku's love interest, Chi Chi, as well as the lead role in one of the segments of the movie Burning Palms. Chung later starred in the Disney Channel TV movie Princess Protection Program, which co-starred Demi Lovato and Selena Gomez. She appeared in 2010 film Grown Ups and had a supporting role in the 2012 martial arts film The Man with the Iron Fists.

In March 2011, Chung played Amber in Zack Snyder's action fantasy film Sucker Punch, which required her to undergo physical training with Navy SEALs and work with stunt and fight choreographers who had worked on Snyder's previous films, 300 and Watchmen. But Chung said she was far more nervous about having to sing in the film: "I don't sing. I'm working on it, but just because I'm Korean doesn't mean I karaoke." She then provided the voice of Aimi Yoshida in the video game X-Men: Destiny, which was released that September.

Chung gained her first major feature film role in the 2012 film Premium Rush, directed by David Koepp. That same year, she starred as the lead in the independent film Eden, in which she played a Korean American girl abducted and coerced into prostitution by American human traffickers. Since 2012, she has appeared in the recurring role of Mulan in the television series Once Upon a Time.

In 2014 Chung co-starred in Sin City: A Dame to Kill For, which was released that August. That October saw the release of the animated Disney film Big Hero 6, in which she provided the voice of GoGo Tomago Big Hero 6, which won the Academy Award for Best Animated Feature. She reprised the role in 2019's Kingdom Hearts III.

Chung and her then-fiancé, Bryan Greenberg, co-starred together as a couple who meet in Hong Kong in the film Already Tomorrow in Hong Kong, which was released in February 2015.

In March 2016, Chung was cast as attorney Lana Harris in the one-hour legal drama Miranda's Rights, but the series was not picked up by NBC after the pilot episode.

Chung was cast as Blink in the Fox superhero series The Gifted, which debuted in October 2017. She plays a younger version of the character played by Fan Bingbing in the 2014 feature film X-Men: Days of Future Past. Of her character, Chung said, "Blink doesn't want to be a hero, she grew up in a world where people are bullied for being mutants" and added that she is "not at her full capacity yet". The following month, Big Hero 6: The Series premiered on Disney XD, on which Chung reprises the role of GoGo Tomago.

In August 2020, Chung appeared in the HBO series Lovecraft Country, beginning in its pilot episode. Chung plays the recurring character Ji-Ah, a young nurse living in Daegu during the Korean War, who falls in love with the male lead, U.S. soldier Atticus Freeman (played by Jonathan Majors), but who harbors a dark secret. The series' sixth episode "Meet Me in Daegu", centers upon Ji-Ah, which reveals depth and complexity in the character, and garnered critical acclaim. According to Chung, it was her most complicated role in 10 years of working as an actress, and was the hardest to prepare for. Chung stated that the experience of playing Ji-Ah strengthened her confidence and inspired her to both pursue more leading roles, and to pitch her own show, which sold.

In 2023, Chung voiced Vax, a freedom fighter and recurring character in My Dad the Bounty Hunter.

Other work
Chung writes for her own fashion blog, What the Chung?

Awards and recognition
On April 2, 2009, Chung won the Female Stars of Tomorrow Award at the 2009 ShoWest industry trade show along with her Sorority Row castmates.

At the 2012 Seattle International Film Festival, Chung won the Golden Space Needle Award for Best Actress for Eden.

Personal life
In 2013, Chung moved to Manhattan. She began dating actor/musician Bryan Greenberg in early 2012. They became engaged in December 2013. During a visit to Chung's hometown of San Francisco, Greenberg proposed to Chung by singing a song he wrote. They were married in October 2015 at the El Capitan Canyon resort in Santa Barbara, California. The wedding was a three-day celebration consisting of a welcome dinner on Halloween Eve to which guests were required to wear costumes, followed by a wedding ceremony on October 31 in which Chung and Greenberg exchanged non-denominational vows. 

On October 24, 2021, the couple announced that they were now the parents of twins, who were brought to term through the use of oocyte cryopreservation.

Filmography

Film

Television

Video games

References

External links

 
 

1983 births
21st-century American actresses
Actresses from San Francisco
American film actresses
American actresses of Korean descent
American soap opera actresses
American television actresses
American voice actresses
Living people
Lowell High School (San Francisco) alumni
The Real World (TV series) cast members
University of California, Riverside alumni
The Challenge (TV series) contestants